Donny Daniels is the men's basketball Director of Player Development at the University of Utah. He previously served as head coach at Cal State Fullerton from 2001–03, was on head coach Rick Majerus' staff as assistant coach at the University of Utah from 1990–2000, a men's basketball assistant coach at UCLA from 2003–2010, and a men's basketball assistant coach at Gonzaga University from 2010–2019. In 2004, Rivals.com stated that Daniels was one of college basketball's Top 25 recruiters. He is the father of four children.

References

External links
Donny Daniels bio at Gonzaga
Donny Daniels bio at Utah

1954 births
Living people
American men's basketball coaches
American men's basketball players
Basketball players from New Orleans
Basketball coaches from Louisiana
Cal State Fullerton Titans men's basketball coaches
Cal State Fullerton Titans men's basketball players
Gonzaga Bulldogs men's basketball coaches
High school basketball coaches in California
Junior college men's basketball coaches in the United States
Junior college men's basketball players in the United States
Los Angeles Harbor College alumni
Sportspeople from New Orleans
UCLA Bruins men's basketball coaches
Utah Utes men's basketball coaches